Michel "Dado" Termanini (born 8 May 1998) is a professional footballer who currently plays as a defender for Kazma. Born in Sweden, Termanini opted to represent Palestine internationally.

Professional career
Termanini started playing football when he was ten and started his career at BK Olympic in Malmö. Termanini joined AFC Eskilstuna at the age of 17 from LB07 Termanini made his professional debut with Ekstilstuna in a 2–1 Allsvenskan win over Kalmar FF on 15 July 2017.

Temanini moved back to Palestine, when he signed for Hilal Al-Quds on 25 September 2018. On 21 April 2019, he returned to Sweden and joined Torns IF. On 18 August 2020, he moved to Egypt and joined ZED FC. after four months, he signed a one-year contract with Oman Professional League side Al-Nasr on 13 December 2020.

On 1 July 2021, he contracted with Kazma SC until the end of the 2021–22 season.

International
Termanini represented the Palestine U23s at the 2018 AFC U-23 Championship. 

On 11 May 2018, Termanini debuted with the Palestine national football team in a friendly 2–0 loss against Kuwait.

Honours
Kazma:
Kuwait Emir Cup (1): 2022

References

External links
 
 

1998 births
Living people
Footballers from Malmö
Citizens of the State of Palestine through descent
Palestinian footballers
Palestine international footballers
Swedish footballers
Association football defenders
AFC Eskilstuna players
Syrianska FC players
Hilal Al-Quds Club players
Allsvenskan players
Superettan players
Ettan Fotboll players
Torns IF players
Palestine youth international footballers
Footballers at the 2018 Asian Games
Palestinian expatriate sportspeople in Kuwait
Swedish expatriate sportspeople in Kuwait
Swedish expatriate footballers
Palestinian expatriate footballers
Al-Nasr SC (Salalah) players
Oman Professional League players
Kazma SC players
Kuwait Premier League players
Swedish people of Palestinian descent
Expatriate footballers in Kuwait
Expatriate footballers in Egypt
Expatriate footballers in Oman
Swedish expatriate sportspeople in Oman
Swedish expatriate sportspeople in Egypt
Palestinian expatriate sportspeople in Oman
Palestinian expatriate sportspeople in Egypt